Leigh railway station was a railway station in Staffordshire, England.

The railway line between Stoke-on-Trent and Uttoxeter was opened by the North Staffordshire Railway (NSR) in 1848 and a station to serve the village of Church Leigh was opened at the same time.

The station remained open until 1966 but goods facilities had been withdrawn in 1964.

References
Notes

Sources

Further reading

Disused railway stations in Staffordshire
Former North Staffordshire Railway stations
Railway stations in Great Britain closed in 1966
Railway stations in Great Britain opened in 1848
Beeching closures in England